Jesse Pelamo (born 22 June 1994) is a Finnish professional ice hockey player.

Playing career
Pelamo played one game in the Liiga for Lukko during the 2017–18 season.

Career statistics

Regular season and playoffs

References

External links

1994 births
Living people
Finnish ice hockey centres
KeuPa HT players
KOOVEE players
Lempäälän Kisa players
Lukko players
Ice hockey people from Tampere